Nosterfield is a hamlet within the civil parish of West Tanfield in the Hambleton district of North Yorkshire, England formerly used for quarrying.

Several of the buildings in the village including the public house are designated as Grade II listed buildings.

Nosterfield Local Nature Reserve is run as part of the Lower Ure Conservation Trust and is one of the most important wetland sites in Yorkshire recognised via designation as a Site of Importance for Nature Conservation (SINC) by North Yorkshire County Council.

Notes

External links

Villages in North Yorkshire
Grade II listed buildings in North Yorkshire
Local Nature Reserves in North Yorkshire
Wensleydale